The Bandar Botanik LRT station is designated to be an elevated light rapid transit (LRT) station in Bandar Botanic, Klang, Selangor, Malaysia, forming part of the Shah Alam line.

The station is marked as Station No. 25 along the RM9 billion line project with the line's maintenance depot located in Johan Setia, Klang. The Bandar Botanik LRT station was expected to be operational in February 2024.

However, on 13 July 2018, it was earmarked as one of the five stations which was postponed in order to reduce overall construction costs.

Surrounding developments
 Botanic Capital commercial area
 Botanic Avenue commercial area
 Botanic Business Gateway commercial area
 GM Klang Wholesale City
 Klinik Kesihatan Bandar Botanik (Bandar Botanic Health Clinic)
 Makmal Keselamatan dan Kualiti Makanan Selangor (Selangor Food Quality and Safety Laboratory)

References

External links
 Official LRT 3 project website
 LRT 3 project video
 Prasarana Malaysia Berhad, LRT 3 operator
 Bandar Botanik LRT Station - mrt.com.my

Shah Alam Line